Pak Chong railway station is a railway station located in Pak Chong Subdistrict, Pak Chong District, Nakhon Ratchasima. It opened in May 1899 as part of the Northeastern Line Muak Lek–Pak Chong section. The line continued to Nakhon Ratchasima in December 1900. It is the nearest and most accessible station for Khao Yai National Park. It is currently being reconstructed as part of the double-tracking project between Map Kabao and Thanon Chira Junction.

Train services 
 Special Express No. 21/22 Bangkok–Ubon Ratchathani–Bangkok
 Express No. 67/68 Bangkok–Ubon Ratchathani–Bangkok
 Express No. 71/72 Bangkok–Si Sa Ket–Bangkok
 Express No. 73/74 Bangkok–Sikhoraphum–Bangkok
 Express No. 77/78 Bangkok–Nong Khai–Bangkok
 Rapid No. 135/136 Bangkok–Ubon Ratchathani–Bangkok
 Rapid No. 139/140 Bangkok–Ubon Ratchathani–Bangkok
 Rapid No. 141/142 Bangkok–Ubon Ratchathani–Bangkok
 Rapid No. 145/146 Bangkok–Ubon Ratchathani–Bangkok
 Ordinary No. 233/234 Bangkok–Surin–Bangkok
 Local No. 431/432 Kaeng Khoi Junction–Khon Kaen–Kaeng Khoi Junction

References 
 
 
 

Railway stations in Thailand
Railway stations opened in 1899